Jordan Cooper Danks (born August 7, 1986) is an American former professional baseball outfielder. He played Major League Baseball (MLB) for the Chicago White Sox and Philadelphia Phillies.

Early life 
Danks graduated from Round Rock High School in Texas in 2005. He was drafted in the 19th round in the 2005 MLB draft by White Sox, but chose instead to attend the University of Texas at Austin and play for the Texas Longhorns baseball team. Danks was drafted again by the White Sox in the 2008 MLB Draft, this time in the 7th round. Jordan is the younger brother of former White Sox starting pitcher John Danks.

Professional career

Chicago White Sox 
On June 7, 2012, Danks made his MLB debut entering the game in the eighth inning as a pinch runner for Paul Konerko in a game against the Toronto Blue Jays. On June 8, Danks recorded his first MLB hit, a single off of Wesley Wright, during an 8–3 loss to the Houston Astros. On August 10, Danks recorded his first major league home run, a walk-off, off of Pat Neshek in a 4–3 win over the Oakland Athletics. Coming into spring training for the 2013 season, Danks was competing for the fourth outfielder spot on the White Sox opening day roster. Danks eventually lost out to DeWayne Wise and was sent to Triple A Charlotte to start the season. Danks was then called up on April 17, 2013 optioning Deunte Heath to Triple A. White Sox manager Robin Ventura said he wanted to bring Danks up because it gave him more options late in games to have Danks pinch-hit, pinch-run, defensive replacement and some spot starts against right-handed pitchers.

On August 25, 2013, during a 5-2 victory over the Texas Rangers his brother, John Danks, was the winning pitcher and Jordan hit a go-ahead home run. According to Elias Sports Bureau, it was the first time since June 5, 1955, that a player homered in support of his brother pitching, when Kansas City catcher Billy Shantz homered in support of his brother Bobby Shantz.

Danks was designated for assignment by the White Sox on January 8, 2015.

Philadelphia Phillies 
Danks was claimed off waivers by the Philadelphia Phillies on January 16, 2015.

Texas Rangers 
Danks and the Texas Rangers agreed to a minor league contract on January 19, 2016. He was released by the Rangers in April.

References

External links 

Texas Longhorns bio

1986 births
Living people
Baseball players at the 2007 Pan American Games
Baseball players at the 2011 Pan American Games
Baseball players from Austin, Texas
Birmingham Barons players
Charlotte Knights players
Chicago White Sox players
Kannapolis Intimidators players
Lehigh Valley IronPigs players
Major League Baseball outfielders
Pan American Games medalists in baseball
Pan American Games silver medalists for the United States
Peoria Javelinas players
Peoria Saguaros players
Philadelphia Phillies players
Round Rock High School alumni
Texas Longhorns baseball players
United States national baseball team players
Winston-Salem Dash players
Medalists at the 2007 Pan American Games
Medalists at the 2011 Pan American Games